Recycling may refer to:

Science
Recycling (technological) A human industrial process of shunting discarded technological artifacts into an industrial repository system that dissipates energy and employs people to manufacture and redistribute new artifacts using the old materials.
Recycling (ecological) Ecosystems use energy (primarily solar) to employ biodiversity working at the base of food webs to recycle mineral nutrients back into living systems.